Dainis is a masculine Latvian given name. Notable people with the name include:

Dainis Bremse (born 1954), Latvian luger
Dainis Deglis (born 1959), Latvian footballer
Dainis Dukurs (born 1954), Latvian bobsledder
Dainis Īvāns (born 1955), Latvian journalist and politician
Dainis Krištopāns (born 1990), Latvian handball player
Dainis Kūla (born 1959), Latvian javelin thrower
Dainis Ozols (born 1966), Latvian cyclist
Dainis Turlais (born 1954), Latvian politician
Dainis Upelnieks (born 1982), Latvian sports shooter

Latvian masculine given names